Miri Science Secondary School is a boarding science secondary school located in Miri, a city in the Malaysian state of Sarawak. The current principal is Dayang Laila Haji Kahar.

Background 
Miri Science Secondary School is established on 1 January 1990 and is the first ever boarding school in Sarawak. At that time, the first batches to register in the school is from Form 1, Form 4 and lower Form 6. There were only five teachers including the principal but then increased to 13 teachers. In 1995, the intake for lower Form 6 was stopped and replaced by the intake for the matriculation programmes of Universiti Kebangsaan Malaysia (UKM) as many as 26 students. However, the programmes ended in 2000 after a new matriculation college is built in Labuan and is taken by the Ministry of Education (MOE).

Administration and enrollment 
Since its establishment, Miri Science Secondary School has been administrated by seven (7) principals, which were:

 Zakiah Haji Omar (1 January 1990 - 15 July 1992)
 Mohd Baharin Harun (16 September 1992 - 18 July 1997)
 Hajah Rosey Haji Yunus (16 September 1997 - 2 May 2006)
 Lily Haji Morni (16 June 2006 - 5 May 2009)
 Hajah Serina Sauni (10 August 2009 - 22 February 2015)
 Mohd Dzul Badzli Abdullah (12 June 2015 - 5 July 2020)
 Dayang Laila Haji Kahar (since 25 September 2020)

The principal is helped by the School Highest Act Body (Malay : Badan Bertindak Tertinggi Sekolah (BBTS)) that compromise the Senior Assistant of Administration, the Senior Assistant of Students Affairs, the Senior Assistant of Co-curriculum, the Head of Science Department, the Head of Language Department, the Head of Vocational and Technic Department, the Head of Humanity Department, and the counsellors. Non-academic staffs are also tasked to help manage the administration.

Currently, there are 48 teachers and are divided into panels according to the subjects taught. The teachers in the school are among the teachers that have at least a degree in consecutive fields.

The students in the school are consists of Malay, Chinese, Indians and Bumiputra Sarawaks such as Ibans, Kayan, Kenyah and others. There are total of 460 registered students as of November 2020. This school only take students for Form 1 until Form 5 (13 to 17 years old). Each form or batch has four (4) classes, named Iltizam, Usaha, Maju and Jaya.

Location 
Miri Science Secondary School is located in Jalan Bakam, on an area with a width of 18.55 hectare (45.8 acre), roughly 10 kilometres from the city of Miri, Sarawak. The school is situated next to the Malaysian Teachers Education Institute, Sarawak Campus and is closed to the Miri Airport. Luak Esplanade, a public beach is located right in front of this school, showing the beauty of South China Sea.

House system 
A tradition of Fully Residential Schools (SBP) in Malaysia, SAINSri also have a house system. Every student will be placed in a house system and remained a member of the house until Form 5. The names of the houses are taken from ancient Greek letters.

 Gamma - red
 Delta - blue
 Sigma - green
 Omega - yellow

Residential colleges (hostels) 
The core of a SBP in Malaysia is its hostels. There are 8 blocks of hostels in this school. 5 from them are for boys students whereas the other 3 are for girls students.

Residential Colleges for Boys

 UPM
 UUM
 UTM
 UNIMAS

Residential Colleges for Girls

 UM
 UKM
 USM

Subjects 
Based on the new Standard Curriculum for Secondary Schools (KSSM), the students take 7/8 subjects only for the Form 3 Assessment (PT3) which are:

 Bahasa Melayu
 English
 Science
 Mathematics
 Pendidikan Islam
 Geografi
 Sejarah
 Reka Bentuk Teknologi or Asas Sains Komputer - chosen during Form 1 registration

For the Malaysian Certificate of Education (SPM), the students will take the Pure Science stream, consists of:

 Bahasa Melayu
 English
 Mathematics
 Pendidikan Islam or Pendidikan Moral
 Sejarah
 Additional Mathematics
 Physics
 Chemistry
 Biology

Other than elective subjects such as Physical and Health Education and Visual Arts Education or Music Arts Education, foreign languages such as Japanese, Arabic and French are also taught in this school. Students are given chance to sit for international examinations such as Proficiency Test for Japanese Language, oversaw by the Japan Foundation in Kuala Lumpur, and the Diplome D etudes en Francais (DELF), oversaw by the Embassy of France in Malaysia.

Co-curriculum activities 
Every Wednesday afternoon, all students and teachers will involved in the co-curriculum activities. The activities will divided to three slots; clubs/associations, uniformed bodies and sports/games. Each students will register for their choice of activities the year before, however, the number of members is limited. The current activities provided are as follows

Infrastructure 
The school has 20 units of classrooms, a computer lab, a library, two science laboratory blocks, a block of canteen and co-operatives, a workshop, a Japanese Language lab, a French Language room, an Arabic Language lab, an administration block, an indoor hall, an outdoor hall, a dining hall, a storeroom for sports equipment, eight blocks of residential colleges including toilets, a prayer hall, two bus garages, a gymnasium, five units of workers barracks, three blocks of teachers flat, two houses for administrators, a grandstand, a football and rugby field, an outdoor hockey field, a cricket court, a table tennis table, two basketball courts, a netball area, two badminton squares (inside the indoor hall), athletics areas and a tarred track.

Address 
Sekolah Menengah Sains Miri,

Jalan Bakam, 98000 Miri, Sarawak.

Tel : 085-421371 Fax: 085-411050

References 

Secondary schools in Sarawak
Educational institutions established in 1990
1990 establishments in Malaysia